Everglade may refer to:

 Everglades, region of tropical wetlands in the US
 Everglade Township, Stevens County, Minnesota, township in Stevens County, Minnesota, the United States
 "Everglade" (song), a 1992 song by L7
 "Everglade", a song by Antony and the Johnsons from The Crying Light

See also
Everglades (disambiguation)